Polly Pocket: 2 Cool at the Pocket Plaza is a 2005 American animated short film based on the Polly Pocket line of dolls. It is the second film in the series, sequel to Polly Pocket: Lunar Eclipse, and preceding PollyWorld. Like the first film, 2 Cool at the Pocket Plaza had an obscure reception in the United States. It was packaged with the 2 Cool At the Pocket Plaza Polly and Pia doll pack.

The film has some scene cameos from the 2004 film My Scene: Masquerade Madness.

Synopsis
When Mr. Pocket opens his fab-u-lishious new hotel, all Polly's friends are invited to the grand opening! Even Polly's cousin, Pia Pocket, flies in from England for the big bash. Those two are total twins...which may come in handy when some mean girls try to ruin the party. But with a little help from her friends and her band, Polly and her cousin can double up to save the day and rock the night away!

Summary
Mr. Pocket opens a new hotel, the Pocket Plaza, also known as the Plaza Hotel in New York City, and Polly and her friends are set to perform at the grand opening. There is a new English friend, Pia Pocket, an identical cousin of Polly, who dreams of being a great rock star. Polly's father is held up at an airport in Iceland and Polly now has to present the hotel opening. At the same time, Polly's nemesis Beth is out to ruin the party and only Pia can save the day.

Plot 
Mr. Pocket opens a new six-star hotel, the Pocket Plaza, and Polly and her friends are set to perform at the grand opening. Since it's gonna happened on the weekend, Polly has invited a new friend from England, her identical cousin Pia Pocket, who has dreams of being a  rock star.

As the girls enjoy the hotel, Pia is told by her chaperone Miss Throckmorton she is not allowed to be in the rock band because anything American is not proper and ladylike, and she should stick to her British heritage. At the same time, Polly's father is held up at an airport in Iceland and Polly now has to present the dedication speech at the hotel opening in his place. Wanting to prove Miss Throckmorton wrong, the girls disguise Pia to look like Polly and teach her about all things American. The girls' plan goes into action with the cousins assuming the opposite's identity, which fools Miss Throckmorton completely. Meanwhile, Polly's jealous rival Beth is suspicious of Polly's sudden change in behavior, eventually meeting the cousins and seeing how identical they are, and plots to use their switch to ruin the ceremony which will be broadcast live.

Miss Throckmorton overheard Beth talking about Pia and Polly's plan and thought Pia disobeyed her, and she runs into Polly, mistaking her for Pia, and grounds her to her hotel room. Pia is forced to take Polly's place at the ceremony with Polly reading her speech over the phone, but Miss Throckmorton catches her and hangs up. However, Pia manages to save the day by improvising with a speech of her own, causing Miss Throckmorton to realize the error of her ways; she apologizes to Polly for kidnapping her, makes amends with Pia, and allows her to pursue her dream of performing with the band. That evening, Polly and the Pockets performance goes off without a hitch, and Pia joins in and thanks Polly for the best weekend ever.

Cast
Polly: Tegan Moss
Pia (British): Ellie Green
Pia (American): Ashleigh Ball
Lila: Brittney Wilson
Lea: Natalie Walters
Shani: Chiara Zanni
Ana: Nicole Bouma
Miss Throckmorton: Pam Hyatt
Beth: Tabitha St. Germain
Evie: Jocelyne Loewen
Tori: Nicole Oliver
Samuel: Russell Roberts
Eric Wilder/Todd: Matt Hill
Rick: Andrew Francis
Hotel Manager: Colin Murdock

References

External links
 
 Polly Pocket official website

2005 direct-to-video films
2005 animated films
2005 films
American children's films
Direct-to-video animated films
Universal Pictures direct-to-video animated films
Films based on Mattel toys
2000s American animated films
2000s English-language films